Mr. Soul! (stylized as Mr. SOUL!) is a 2018 American documentary film produced, written and directed by documentary filmmaker Melissa Haizlip. The film was co-produced by Doug Blush and co-directed by Sam Pollard. The film tells the story of Ellis Haizlip, the producer and host of SOUL!, the music-and-talk program that aired on public television from 1968 to 1973 and aimed at a Black audience. It was released in 2018 and has since received 21 filmmaking awards. Attorney Chaz Ebert, record executive Ron Gillyard, producer and director Stan Lathan, producer Rishi Rajani, producer Stephanie T. Rance, actor Blair Underwood and screenwriter, producer and actress Lena Waithe are the executive producers of the film.

In March 2021, it was announced by the Academy of Motion Pictures Arts & Sciences that “Show Me Your Soul” was on the 93rd Oscars shortlist for Best Original Song.

On June 6, 2022 Academy Award winning actor Morgan Freeman announced that Mr. Soul! won the Peabody Award for Best Documentary.

Synopsis
The film explores the five seasons of SOUL! against the backdrop of a swiftly changing political landscape. The film interweaves archival footage with rare performances and interviews from the SOUL! show, contemporary interviews with guests who appeared on SOUL! a Black women-led crew working behind-the-scenes including Harry Belafonte, Nikki Giovanni, The Last Poets, Ashford & Simpson, Black Ivory, Sonia Sanchez, Carmen De Lavallade, Felipe Luciano, and Ronald Bell of Kool & the Gang. SOUL! gave exposure to popular stars like Stevie Wonder, Wilson Pickett, Al Green and Earth, Wind & Fire and underground artists, including McCoy Tyner and the saxophonist Rahsaan Roland Kirk, and authors like James Baldwin and Toni Morrison, and activists including Kathleen Cleaver of the Black Panther Party and Stokely Carmichael (Kwame Ture).

The words of Ellis Haizlip are taken from interviews, news articles, correspondence and journal entries between 1968 and 1973. Ellis Haizlip's words are voiced by the actor Blair Underwood, who also serves as an executive producer on the film.

“The primary purpose of Soul! is neither to educate nor entertain, but to give people a chance to share in the Black experience. The show must do that first. Then it can educate and entertain. Soul! makes Blacks visible in a society where they have been largely invisible.” Ellis Haizlip 1968.

Release
On April 22, 2018, Mr. SOUL! premiered at the 2018 Tribeca Film Festival. The film was screened at 50 film festivals in 2018 and 2019 including AFI DOCS, BFI London,  Heartland International Film Festival, Hot Docs, Indie Memphis, Martha's Vineyard African American Film Festival, True / False Film Festival, Urbanworld Film Festival, Woodstock Film Festival, and Pan African Film Festival, among others, and won more than 18 awards. On August 28, 2020, Mr. SOUL! was released in limited theaters and virtual cinemas.

Mr. SOUL!, made its public television debut on February 22, 2021, on PBS.

HBO Max announced, Mr. Soul! will premiere on their streaming service on August 1, 2021.

Critical reception
Mr. Soul! has received positive reviews and has  rating on Rotten Tomatoes based on  critic reviews, summarizing: "Mr. SOUL! aims an overdue spotlight on a groundbreaking chapter in the history of American public television – and the host who helped make it all happen."

End Title Song
"Show Me Your Soul" is the end title song by Grammy Award winners Lalah Hathaway and Robert Glasper. The song, which is also written by Hathaway and Glasper along with Muhammad Ayers and Melissa Haizlip was on the shortlist for the 93rd Academy Awards in the category of Music (Best Original Song).

Cast
 
 Blair Underwood as Voice of Ellis Haizlip 
 Questlove 
 Novella Nelson 
 Stan Lathan 
 Carmen De Lavallade 
 Dr. Loretta Long 
 Kathleen Cleaver  
 Ronald Bell 
 Kool & The Gang 
 Melba Moore
 Nikki Giovanni 
 Ashford & Simpson 
 Sonia Sanchez 
 Felipe Luciano 
 Louis J. Massiah 
 Black Ivory
 Alvin F. Poussaint 
 The Last Poets 
 Greg Tate 
 Christopher Lukas 
 Chester Higgins Jr. 
George Faison
Gayle Wald 
Dr. Billy Taylor
Sarah Lewis 
Sylvia Waters
Judith Jamison 
Robert Thompson 
Sade Lythcott 
Obba Babatunde 
David Adams Leeming 
Leroy Burgess
Stuart Bascombe
Russell Patterson
Dr. Harold Haizlip
Alice LaBrie
Rev. Dr. Cheryl Sanders 
Beth Ausbrooks 
Mary Wilburn 
Leslie Demus

 Archival footage

 Ellis Haizlip 
 Harry Belafonte
 Anna Maria Horsford 
 Sidney Poitier 
 Patti LaBelle 
 Sarah Dash
 Stevie Wonder
 Gladys Knight 
 Maya Angelou 
 Bill Withers
 James Baldwin 
 Earth Wind & Fire
 Al Green 
 Cicely Tyson 
 B.B. King
 Donny Hathaway
 Hugh Masekela
 Arsenio Hall 
 Muhammad Ali 
 The Delfonics 
 Mandrill
 New Birth 
Black Ivory
 Tito Puente 
Stokely Carmichael
Miriam Makeba 
 Minister Louis Farrakhan

Awards and accolades
Mr. SOUL! received 32 Nominations and won 21 awards including 14 Film Festival Awards.

On April 13, 2022, Mr. SOUL! was nominated for a 2022 Peabody Award in the category of Best Documentary. On June 6, 2022 actor Morgan Freeman announced that Mr. Soul! won the Peabody Award for Best Documentary.

References

External links
 Official Site
 Rotten Tomatoes Reviews
 
 Mr. SOUL! PBS - Independent Lens

2018 documentary films
2010s English-language films